Aspicilia cinerea (cinder lichen) is a gray to almost white, 1.5 – 15 cm wide, crustose areolate lichen with large apothecia that mostly grows on rock in the mountains. It grows in variable forms, from having a continuous surface to being areolate. It grows in Eurasia, and North America on siliceous rock, schist or igneous rock in habitats exposed to sunlight, also rarely on calciferous rock.

Flat to almost convex areoles are angular to irregular, and 0.2 – 2 mm in diameter. They are contiguous but clearly separated by well defined cracks. It usually lacks a prothallus. It may be rimose toward the outer edges. Each areole has 1 – 10, round to angular or irregular, 0.1 -1.6 mm apothecia that  may be confluent when numerous. Apothecia have usually black concave discs, with exciple margins of thallus tissue. Asci are club shaped (clavate), with 8 ellipsoid ascospores.

Lichen spot tests on the cortex and medulla are K+ red, KC−, P+ yellow or P+ orange, with the medulla sometimes testing K+ yellow and P+ orange. Secondary metabolites include norstictic acid and often connorstictic acid in traces, and more rarely hyposalazinic acid.

The photobiont is a chlorococcoid.

References

Pertusariales
Lichen species
Lichens of Asia
Lichens of Europe
Lichens of North America
Lichens described in 1767
Taxa named by Carl Linnaeus